The Daejoo Cup (also known as the Large Boat Senior Cup) is a  Go competition in Korea. It is sponsored by the Daejoo Group.

Past winners and runners-up

References

Go competitions in South Korea